The Association Citizen's Educational Center 
(Bosnian: Građanski edukativni centar) is an independent, non-governmental, non-partisan and non-profit organization based in Tuzla, Bosnia and Herzegovina.

Citizen's Educational Center is registered in the Register of Associations at the Ministry of Justice of Bosnia and Herzegovina under the registration number of 959 book I. On the day of registration the Organization shall have legal personality and freedom of action by region throughout Bosnia and Herzegovina.

Mission 
Association „Citizen's Educational Center“ was established in Tuzla for act both locally and globally in order to animate people to participate in social life in order to promote civil society through programs of promotion of values on which members of associations and others can build their moral development and the integrity of general education, education through formal teaching and training staff and informal learning and the creation positive habits in all categories of citizens in terms of active attitude towards social events. „Citizen's Educational Center“ seeks to become a relevant educational factor in order to improve civil society.

The objective, tasks and activities 

- Operate and animate citizens to participate in social life in order to promote civil society through programs as:

- General education in order to create conditions for job creation and employment.

- Participation in the development of preventive programs healthy society.

- Promotion of the values on which members of the association and others can build their moral 
development and integrity.

- Education through formal teaching and training staff as well as informal learning, encouraging   
creative, productive development and conscious citizens.

- Create positive habits among all categories of citizens in terms of active attitude towards 
social events, and creating positive habits in the use of leisure time.

- Organization to help poor and disadvantaged, and help disabled people.

- Developing all aspects of Educational work, education - pedagogic and informative activities.

Postbaccalaureate Educational Program 

The citizen's Educational Center is pleased to offer a Post
Baccalaureate Diploma in Music Education (PBDME). The PBDME is a 30 credit hour
program developed for in-service teachers and other educators and care
givers. Earning a PBDE has many benefits. It allows educators an opportunity to grow
personally and professionally by targeting and building their skills in specific areas. It
opens up possibilities for lifelong learning and personal/career enhancement for
individuals who do not have the time, inclination, or background to enrol in a formal
graduate program.

To be considered for the Citizen's Educational Center PBDME, candidates must meet the
following requirements:
• Have maintained a minimum GPA of 2.0 in all degree or after-degree programs.  
• Hold a Bachelor of Education degree (or equivalent such as Teacher of education)
• Students may be admitted to the General Stream, if they hold a bachelor's degree
in an area other than Education, as long as they have two full years of related work
experience. Students must submit a resume with their application. Students
applying to the Counselling stream must have completed a B.Ed. Degree

Music educational program Avista 

"Music educational program Avista" or "MEP Avista" is the first program of this type in the territory of Bosnia and Herzegovina and the Western Balkans.

The primary goals:

-	to provide music majors with a high quality elementary education.

-	to serve as an educational and cultural resource for the Association and local communities.

-	to provide opportunities for children to increase their musical skills, understanding and appreciation.

-	Improve the music and art knowledge of young people ages 6 to 16 in the City of Tuzla and region.

The concept of MEP Avista

Children from 6 – 16 years old (beginners) get very excited about taking their first music education. The „MEP AVISTA“ – presented in a relaxed and encouraging way, without a pass or fail to worry about and no marks are awarded, just positive and helpful comments written on the certificate by the professor – is an ideal introduction to the whole experience. The program gives them a goal to work towards as well as the thrill of receiving a certificate (diploma) – something they can be really proud of.

The „MEP AVISTA“ is designed both to provide an assessment for pupils after nine to ten months’ tuition (studies) and to encourage the building of good musical and technical foundations. Educational program includes all the sorts of skills beginners will be developing at this stage, such as a sense of pitch and rhythm, controlled, playing, accuracy and quality of tone, and the basics of musical perception.

Total duration of the school program is 7 years. Students at the conclusion of a certain educational level may continue their education to the next level after which student receives a Certificate. At the end of the 7 years overall program the examiner (student) will present the candidate with a Diploma of music 

The holder of the main activities and staff:

The perpetrator of the entire program is Association  „Citizen's Educational Center“ and
„School of music arts“ founded by the Association. Professional staff at the program consists university graduate teachers/professors of music education and arts.

GEC Portal 
Independent information portal, GEC Portal is socially engaged media on the Internet address at www.gec.ba. GEC Portal operates in a non-profit basis from 1 October 2011th. It occurs as a direct product of the development program EMvI MEDIA with a view to developing all aspects of information activities. The primary role of the MEDIA EMvI project is dissemination of news and audio-visual content, education and entertainment through the grassroots population GEC Portal and all other media forms.

References

External links 
  Official CEC web portal on 
  School of music arts (MEP Avista) a subdomen web page on 
  CEC on 
  GEC on 
  GEC MAPLANDIA on 

Education in Tuzla
Buildings and structures in Tuzla
Educational organizations based in Bosnia and Herzegovina
Educational institutions established in 2009
2009 establishments in Bosnia and Herzegovina
Bosnia (region)